Iraq protests may refer to:
1999 Shia uprising in Iraq, short period of unrest in Iraq in early 1999 following the killing of Mohammad Mohammad Sadeq al-Sadr by the then Ba'athist government of Iraq.
2011 Kurdish protests in Iraq, were a series of demonstrations and riots against the Kurdistan Regional Government in northern Iraq.
2011 Iraqi protests, Part of the Arab Spring, came in the wake of the Tunisian revolution and 2011 Egyptian revolution.
2012–13 Iraqi protests, started on 21 December 2012 following a raid on the home of Sunni Finance Minister Rafi al-Issawi and the arrest of 10 of his bodyguards.
2015–2018 Iraqi protests, over deteriorating economic conditions and state corruption started on 16 July 2015 in Baghdad.
2019 Iraqi protests also called October Revolution, Part of the Arab protests (2018–present), ongoing series of protests started on 1 October 2019.
Protests against the Iraq War, after the 2003 invasion of Iraq, large-scale protests against the Iraq War were held in many cities worldwide, often coordinated to occur simultaneously around the world.
15 February 2003 anti-Iraq-war protests, On 15 February 2003, a coordinated day of protests started across the world in which people in more than 600 cities expressed opposition to the imminent Iraq War.